Eugen Ray (26 July 1957 in Gerbstedt, Bezirk Halle, East Germany – 18 January 1986 in Leipzig, East Germany) was an East German sprinter who ran in the 100 metres and 200 metres.

Biography
Ray established himself in the elite of world sprinting by setting a world junior 100 m record of 10.16 seconds. He was East German 100 metres champion in 1977, 1978, and 1980. In 1978 he also won the East German indoor 60 metres titles, as well as twice indoor 100 metre champion.

He was European cup semi finalist 100 metre champion in 1975, 1977, and 1979. And in 1977 he was European cup 100/200 metre winner. After this he then went on to the World Cup held in West Germany where he came second in the 100 metres narrowly beaten by Steve Williams of the USA. He then finished 2nd again with the German sprint relay team. A year later he was European silver medallist in the 100 metres and 4 × 100 metres.

In 1980, he went to the Summer Olympics in Moscow where he ran in the 100 metres, but did not make it past the semi-final. He was in the East German relay team that finished fifth in the final.

Ray had a running style that showed brute strength and power and he was often referred to as the  "power man" of sprinting by several sports commentators in the late 1970s. He was quite heavy and well muscled compared with most of his opponents and he appeared to "bulldoze" his way along the track.

His 100 m personal best was 10.12 seconds.

Ray died aged 28 on 18 January 1986 in a car crash whilst working as a traffic officer in East Germany. He was survived by his wife Marlies Ray who at the time was pregnant with their son.

See also
 German all-time top lists – 100 metres
 German all-time top lists – 200 metres

References

External links
 
 European Championships

1957 births
1986 deaths
People from Mansfeld-Südharz
People from Bezirk Halle
East German male sprinters
Sportspeople from Saxony-Anhalt
Olympic athletes of East Germany
Athletes (track and field) at the 1980 Summer Olympics
European Athletics Championships medalists
Road incident deaths in Germany